Special Forces is a video game developed by Sleepless Knights and published by MicroProse in 1992 for the Amiga, Atari ST and PC DOS. In the game, a team of special operatives are to infiltrate enemy territory to complete various objectives. It is a sequel to Airborne Ranger.

Gameplay
Special Forces lets the player select a team of four from a squad of eight operatives. Once a mission is selected in one of the four regions (temperate zone, arctic, desert and jungle - daytime and nighttime variants) the player is briefed. Objectives range from hostage rescues, destroy specific objects, reconnaissance missions. The player needs to plan the mission carefully since the player does not control the operatives directly. Instead the player gives the soldiers orders similar to the game Commandos.

The game displays a top-down view of a part of the mission area in various configurations (one viewport per soldier up to four views at the same time in split-screen mode). The player also has access to a strategic battle map with enemy locations visible (there is no fog of war in the game).

See also
United States Army Special Forces in popular culture

External links

Special Forces at the Hall of Light
Special Forces for Android at the CS Light

References 

1992 video games
Amiga games
Atari ST games
Cold War video games
DOS games
MicroProse games
Single-player video games
Stealth video games
Top-down video games
Video game sequels
Video games developed in the United Kingdom
Video games scored by John Broomhall